Daniela Di Lillo (formerly Niederer, born 20 July 1990), better known by her stage name Nora En Pure is a Swiss-South African DJ and deep house producer. She first received recognition for her 2013 single "Come With Me". Further popular releases are "Morning Dew", "Lake Arrowhead", and "Tears In Your Eyes." In July 2016, she was invited to put together a two-hour long mix for Pete Tong's radio show: "BBC's Essential Mix".

Biography

Early life 
Born to a South African mother and a Swiss father in Johannesburg, Di Lillo migrated to Switzerland during her infancy. Raised in a musical environment, she learned to play musical instruments since childhood.

Before engaging in the electronic music scene, she used to listen to other musical genres including classical music, pop and rock.

Background 
Being an outdoors enthusiast, Nora En Pure finds most creative inspiration in nature and travels resulting in organic and nature-infused productions and sets. Weaving her influences of South African roots with the love for classical music and soundtracks, tracks often paint a certain scenery combining tribal percussion with traditional Western instrumentation, creating emotional melodies and harmonies with piano, strings, wind instruments and synthesizers. 

Being part of the Helvetic Nerds in Switzerland, Nora En Pure has a long year studio and label partnership with Enormous Tunes label owner Christian Hirt. Through the long term collaboration they developed a characteristic sound that is well recognizable, distinct and sets the electronic act apart from general dance music. Nora En Pure was one of the first artists of her kind of melodic and organic deep house sound when this genre gained popularity. However the productions and live sets always remained unique connecting dots between different and disparate sounds, styles and scenes with ease and in her own raw style setting her apart from the mainstream.

Musical career 
Her first steps into the global scene she started with the single "Saltwater" which contains elements of "True" by Spandau Ballet, and was included in the 2012 compilation by Buddha Bar. In 2013 the success of "Come With Me" followed, which remained in the Top 100 of Beatport's download list for more than seven months. 

She gained international recognition by touring, with appearances at Coachella Festival on the Yuma stage (which hosts the best artists of deep house and techno music), at the Tomorrowland "Daybreak Session" (a 3-hour set on the mainstage of alongside Joris Voorn, Carl Cox and others), or with a whole catalogue of EPs and remixes (for artists such as Faithless, Wretch 32, Klingande, Oliver Heldens, Paul Harris and his side project Dirty Vegas).

In 2017, she released an extended play titled Conquer Yosemite.

Discography

Awards and nominations

International Dance Music Awards

References 

1990 births
South African DJs
South African house musicians
Swiss DJs
South African people of Swiss descent
South African emigrants to Switzerland
Living people
Electronic musicians
Deep house musicians
Electronic dance music DJs
Progressive house musicians
Women DJs